Addition (usually signified by the plus symbol ) is one of the four basic operations of arithmetic, the other three being subtraction, multiplication and division. The addition of two whole numbers results in the total amount or sum of those values combined. The example in the adjacent image shows two columns of three apples and two apples each, totaling at five apples. This observation is equivalent to the mathematical expression  (that is, "3 plus 2 is equal to 5").

Besides counting items, addition can also be defined and executed without referring to concrete objects, using abstractions called numbers instead, such as integers, real numbers and complex numbers. Addition belongs to arithmetic, a branch of mathematics. In algebra, another area of mathematics, addition can also be performed on abstract objects such as vectors, matrices, subspaces and subgroups.

Addition has several important properties. It is commutative, meaning that the order of the operands does not matter, and it is associative, meaning that when one adds more than two numbers, the order in which addition is performed does not matter (see Summation). Addition of  does not change a number. Addition also obeys predictable rules concerning related operations such as subtraction and multiplication.

Performing addition is one of the simplest numerical tasks to do. Addition of very small numbers is accessible to toddlers; the most basic task, can be performed by infants as young as five months, and even some members of other animal species. In primary education, students are taught to add numbers in the decimal system, starting with single digits and progressively tackling more difficult problems. Mechanical aids range from the ancient abacus to the modern computer, where research on the most efficient implementations of addition continues to this day.

Notation and terminology

Addition is written using the plus sign "+" between the terms; that is, in infix notation. The result is expressed with an equals sign. For example,
 ("one plus one equals two")
 ("two plus two equals four")
 ("one plus two equals three")
 (see "associativity" below)
 (see "multiplication" below)

There are also situations where addition is "understood", even though no symbol appears:
 A whole number followed immediately by a fraction indicates the sum of the two, called a mixed number. For example, This notation can cause confusion, since in most other contexts, juxtaposition denotes multiplication instead.

The sum of a series of related numbers can be expressed through capital sigma notation, which compactly denotes iteration. For example,

Terms
The numbers or the objects to be added in general addition are collectively referred to as the terms, the addends or the summands;
this terminology carries over to the summation of multiple terms.
This is to be distinguished from factors, which are multiplied.
Some authors call the first addend the augend. In fact, during the Renaissance, many authors did not consider the first addend an "addend" at all. Today, due to the commutative property of addition, "augend" is rarely used, and both terms are generally called addends.

All of the above terminology derives from Latin. "Addition" and "add" are English words derived from the Latin verb addere, which is in turn a compound of ad "to" and dare "to give", from the Proto-Indo-European root  "to give"; thus to add is to give to. Using the gerundive suffix -nd results in "addend", "thing to be added". Likewise from augere "to increase", one gets "augend", "thing to be increased".

"Sum" and "summand" derive from the Latin noun summa "the highest, the top" and associated verb summare. This is appropriate not only because the sum of two positive numbers is greater than either, but because it was common for the ancient Greeks and Romans to add upward, contrary to the modern practice of adding downward, so that a sum was literally higher than the addends.
Addere and summare date back at least to Boethius, if not to earlier Roman writers such as Vitruvius and Frontinus; Boethius also used several other terms for the addition operation. The later Middle English terms "adden" and "adding" were popularized by Chaucer.

The plus sign "+" (Unicode:U+002B; ASCII: &#43;) is an abbreviation of the Latin word et, meaning "and". It appears in mathematical works dating back to at least 1489.

Interpretations
Addition is used to model many physical processes. Even for the simple case of adding natural numbers, there are many possible interpretations and even more visual representations.

Combining sets

Possibly the most basic interpretation of addition lies in combining sets:
 When two or more disjoint collections are combined into a single collection, the number of objects in the single collection is the sum of the numbers of objects in the original collections.

This interpretation is easy to visualize, with little danger of ambiguity. However, it is not obvious how one should extend this version of addition to include fractional numbers or negative numbers.

One possible fix is to consider collections of objects that can be easily divided, such as pies or, still better, segmented rods. Rather than solely combining collections of segments, rods can be joined end-to-end, which illustrates another conception of addition: adding not the rods but the lengths of the rods.

Extending a length

A second interpretation of addition comes from extending an initial length by a given length:
 When an original length is extended by a given amount, the final length is the sum of the original length and the length of the extension.

The sum a + b can be interpreted as a binary operation that combines a and b, in an algebraic sense, or it can be interpreted as the addition of b more units to a. Under the latter interpretation, the parts of a sum  play asymmetric roles, and the operation  is viewed as applying the unary operation +b to a. Instead of calling both a and b addends, it is more appropriate to call a the augend in this case, since a plays a passive role. The unary view is also useful when discussing subtraction, because each unary addition operation has an inverse unary subtraction operation, and vice versa.

Properties

Commutativity

Addition is commutative, meaning that one can change the order of the terms in a sum, but still get the same result. Symbolically, if a and b are any two numbers, then
a + b = b + a.
The fact that addition is commutative is known as the "commutative law of addition" or "commutative property of addition". Some other binary operations are commutative, such as multiplication, but many others are not, such as subtraction and division.

Associativity

Addition is associative, which means that when three or more numbers are added together, the order of operations does not change the result.

As an example, should the expression a + b + c be defined to mean (a + b) + c or a + (b + c)? Given that addition is associative, the choice of definition is irrelevant. For any three numbers a, b, and c, it is true that . For example, .

When addition is used together with other operations, the order of operations becomes important. In the standard order of operations, addition is a lower priority than exponentiation, nth roots, multiplication and division, but is given equal priority to subtraction.

Identity element

Adding zero to any number, does not change the number; this means that zero is the identity element for addition, and is also known as the additive identity. In symbols, for every , one has
.
This law was first identified in Brahmagupta's Brahmasphutasiddhanta in 628 AD, although he wrote it as three separate laws, depending on whether a is negative, positive, or zero itself, and he used words rather than algebraic symbols. Later Indian mathematicians refined the concept; around the year 830, Mahavira wrote, "zero becomes the same as what is added to it", corresponding to the unary statement . In the 12th century, Bhaskara wrote, "In the addition of cipher, or subtraction of it, the quantity, positive or negative, remains the same", corresponding to the unary statement .

Successor
Within the context of integers, addition of one also plays a special role: for any integer a, the integer  is the least integer greater than a, also known as the successor of a. For instance, 3 is the successor of 2 and 7 is the successor of 6. Because of this succession, the value of  can also be seen as the bth successor of a, making addition iterated succession. For example,  is 8, because 8 is the successor of 7, which is the successor of 6, making 8 the 2nd successor of 6.

Units
To numerically add physical quantities with units, they must be expressed with common units . For example, adding 50 milliliters to 150 milliliters gives 200 milliliters. However, if a measure of 5 feet is extended by 2 inches, the sum is 62 inches, since 60 inches is synonymous with 5 feet. On the other hand, it is usually meaningless to try to add 3 meters and 4 square meters, since those units are incomparable; this sort of consideration is fundamental in dimensional analysis.

Performing addition

Innate ability
Studies on mathematical development starting around the 1980s have exploited the phenomenon of habituation: infants look longer at situations that are unexpected. A seminal experiment by Karen Wynn in 1992 involving Mickey Mouse dolls manipulated behind a screen demonstrated that five-month-old infants expect  to be 2, and they are comparatively surprised when a physical situation seems to imply that  is either 1 or 3. This finding has since been affirmed by a variety of laboratories using different methodologies. Another 1992 experiment with older toddlers, between 18 and 35 months, exploited their development of motor control by allowing them to retrieve ping-pong balls from a box; the youngest responded well for small numbers, while older subjects were able to compute sums up to 5.

Even some nonhuman animals show a limited ability to add, particularly primates. In a 1995 experiment imitating Wynn's 1992 result (but using eggplants instead of dolls), rhesus macaque and cottontop tamarin monkeys performed similarly to human infants. More dramatically, after being taught the meanings of the Arabic numerals 0 through 4, one chimpanzee was able to compute the sum of two numerals without further training. More recently, Asian elephants have demonstrated an ability to perform basic arithmetic.

Childhood learning
Typically, children first master counting. When given a problem that requires that two items and three items be combined, young children model the situation with physical objects, often fingers or a drawing, and then count the total. As they gain experience, they learn or discover the strategy of "counting-on": asked to find two plus three, children count three past two, saying "three, four, five" (usually ticking off fingers), and arriving at five. This strategy seems almost universal; children can easily pick it up from peers or teachers. Most discover it independently. With additional experience, children learn to add more quickly by exploiting the commutativity of addition by counting up from the larger number, in this case, starting with three and counting "four, five." Eventually children begin to recall certain addition facts ("number bonds"), either through experience or rote memorization. Once some facts are committed to memory, children begin to derive unknown facts from known ones. For example, a child asked to add six and seven may know that  and then reason that  is one more, or 13. Such derived facts can be found very quickly and most elementary school students eventually rely on a mixture of memorized and derived facts to add fluently.

Different nations introduce whole numbers and arithmetic at different ages, with many countries teaching addition in pre-school. However, throughout the world, addition is taught by the end of the first year of elementary school.

Table
Children are often presented with the addition table of pairs of numbers from 0 to 9 to memorize. Knowing this, children can perform any addition.

Decimal system
The prerequisite to addition in the decimal system is the fluent recall or derivation of the 100 single-digit "addition facts". One could memorize all the facts by rote, but pattern-based strategies are more enlightening and, for most people, more efficient:
 Commutative property: Mentioned above, using the pattern a + b = b + a reduces the number of "addition facts" from 100 to 55.
 One or two more: Adding 1 or 2 is a basic task, and it can be accomplished through counting on or, ultimately, intuition.
 Zero: Since zero is the additive identity, adding zero is trivial. Nonetheless, in the teaching of arithmetic, some students are introduced to addition as a process that always increases the addends; word problems may help rationalize the "exception" of zero.
 Doubles: Adding a number to itself is related to counting by two and to multiplication. Doubles facts form a backbone for many related facts, and students find them relatively easy to grasp.
 Near-doubles: Sums such as 6 + 7 = 13 can be quickly derived from the doubles fact  by adding one more, or from  but subtracting one.
 Five and ten: Sums of the form 5 +  and 10 +  are usually memorized early and can be used for deriving other facts.
 Making ten: An advanced strategy uses 10 as an intermediate for sums involving 8 or 9; for example,  .
As students grow older, they commit more facts to memory, and learn to derive other facts rapidly and fluently. Many students never commit all the facts to memory, but can still find any basic fact quickly.

Carry

The standard algorithm for adding multidigit numbers is to align the addends vertically and add the columns, starting from the ones column on the right. If a column exceeds nine, the extra digit is "carried" into the next column. For example, in the addition 

   ¹
   27
 + 59
 ————
   86

7 + 9 = 16, and the digit 1 is the carry. An alternate strategy starts adding from the most significant digit on the left; this route makes carrying a little clumsier, but it is faster at getting a rough estimate of the sum. There are many alternative methods.

Since the end of the 20th century, some US programs, including TERC, decided to remove the traditional transfer method from their curriculum. This decision was criticized, which is why some states and counties didn't support this experiment.

Decimal fractions
Decimal fractions can be added by a simple modification of the above process. One aligns two decimal fractions above each other, with the decimal point in the same location. If necessary, one can add trailing zeros to a shorter decimal to make it the same length as the longer decimal. Finally, one performs the same addition process as above, except the decimal point is placed in the answer, exactly where it was placed in the summands.

As an example, 45.1 + 4.34 can be solved as follows:
    4 5 . 1 0
 +  0 4 . 3 4
 ————————————
    4 9 . 4 4

Scientific notation

Addition requires two numbers in scientific notation to be represented using the same exponential part, so that the two significands can simply be added.

For example:

Non-decimal

Addition in other bases is very similar to decimal addition. As an example, one can consider addition in binary. Adding two single-digit binary numbers is relatively simple, using a form of carrying:
0 + 0 → 0
0 + 1 → 1
1 + 0 → 1
1 + 1 → 0, carry 1 (since 1 + 1 = 2 = 0 + (1 × 21))
Adding two "1" digits produces a digit "0", while 1 must be added to the next column. This is similar to what happens in decimal when certain single-digit numbers are added together; if the result equals or exceeds the value of the radix (10), the digit to the left is incremented:
5 + 5 → 0, carry 1 (since 5 + 5 = 10 = 0 + (1 × 101))
7 + 9 → 6, carry 1 (since 7 + 9 = 16 = 6 + (1 × 101))

This is known as carrying. When the result of an addition exceeds the value of a digit, the procedure is to "carry" the excess amount divided by the radix (that is, 10/10) to the left, adding it to the next positional value. This is correct since the next position has a weight that is higher by a factor equal to the radix. Carrying works the same way in binary:

   
     0 1 1 0 1
 +   1 0 1 1 1
 —————————————
   1 0 0 1 0 0 = 36

In this example, two numerals are being added together: 011012 (1310) and 101112 (2310). The top row shows the carry bits used. Starting in the rightmost column, . The 1 is carried to the left, and the 0 is written at the bottom of the rightmost column. The second column from the right is added:  again; the 1 is carried, and 0 is written at the bottom. The third column: . This time, a 1 is carried, and a 1 is written in the bottom row. Proceeding like this gives the final answer 1001002 (3610).

Computers

Analog computers work directly with physical quantities, so their addition mechanisms depend on the form of the addends. A mechanical adder might represent two addends as the positions of sliding blocks, in which case they can be added with an averaging lever. If the addends are the rotation speeds of two shafts, they can be added with a differential. A hydraulic adder can add the pressures in two chambers by exploiting Newton's second law to balance forces on an assembly of pistons. The most common situation for a general-purpose analog computer is to add two voltages (referenced to ground); this can be accomplished roughly with a resistor network, but a better design exploits an operational amplifier.

Addition is also fundamental to the operation of digital computers, where the efficiency of addition, in particular the carry mechanism, is an important limitation to overall performance.

The abacus, also called a counting frame, is a calculating tool that was in use centuries before the adoption of the written modern numeral system and is still widely used by merchants, traders and clerks in Asia, Africa, and elsewhere; it dates back to at least 2700–2300 BC, when it was used in Sumer.

Blaise Pascal invented the mechanical calculator in 1642; it was the first operational adding machine. It made use of a gravity-assisted carry mechanism. It was the only operational mechanical calculator in the 17th century and the earliest automatic, digital computer. Pascal's calculator was limited by its carry mechanism, which forced its wheels to only turn one way so it could add. To subtract, the operator had to use the Pascal's calculator's complement, which required as many steps as an addition. Giovanni Poleni followed Pascal, building the second functional mechanical calculator in 1709, a calculating clock made of wood that, once setup, could multiply two numbers automatically.

Adders execute integer addition in electronic digital computers, usually using binary arithmetic. The simplest architecture is the ripple carry adder, which follows the standard multi-digit algorithm. One slight improvement is the carry skip design, again following human intuition; one does not perform all the carries in computing , but one bypasses the group of 9s and skips to the answer.

In practice, computational addition may be achieved via XOR and AND bitwise logical operations in conjunction with bitshift operations as shown in the pseudocode below. Both XOR and AND gates are straightforward to realize in digital logic allowing the realization of full adder circuits which in turn may be combined into more complex logical operations. In modern digital computers, integer addition is typically the fastest arithmetic instruction, yet it has the largest impact on performance, since it underlies all floating-point operations as well as such basic tasks as address generation during memory access and fetching instructions during branching. To increase speed, modern designs calculate digits in parallel; these schemes go by such names as carry select, carry lookahead, and the Ling pseudocarry. Many implementations are, in fact, hybrids of these last three designs. Unlike addition on paper, addition on a computer often changes the addends. On the ancient abacus and adding board, both addends are destroyed, leaving only the sum. The influence of the abacus on mathematical thinking was strong enough that early Latin texts often claimed that in the process of adding "a number to a number", both numbers vanish. In modern times, the ADD instruction of a microprocessor often replaces the augend with the sum but preserves the addend. In a high-level programming language, evaluating  does not change either a or b; if the goal is to replace a with the sum this must be explicitly requested, typically with the statement .

// Iterative algorithm
int add(int x, int y) {
    int carry = 0;
    while (y != 0) {      
        carry = AND(x, y);   // Logical AND
        x     = XOR(x, y);   // Logical XOR
        y     = carry << 1;  // left bitshift carry by one
    }
    return x; 
}

// Recursive algorithm
int add(int x, int y) {
    return x if (y == 0) else add(XOR(x, y), AND(x, y) << 1);
}

On a computer, if the result of an addition is too large to store, an arithmetic overflow occurs, resulting in an incorrect answer. Unanticipated arithmetic overflow is a fairly common cause of program errors. Such overflow bugs may be hard to discover and diagnose because they may manifest themselves only for very large input data sets, which are less likely to be used in validation tests. The Year 2000 problem was a series of bugs where overflow errors occurred due to use of a 2-digit format for years.

Addition of numbers
To prove the usual properties of addition, one must first define addition for the context in question. Addition is first defined on the natural numbers. In set theory, addition is then extended to progressively larger sets that include the natural numbers: the integers, the rational numbers, and the real numbers. (In mathematics education, positive fractions are added before negative numbers are even considered; this is also the historical route.)

Natural numbers

There are two popular ways to define the sum of two natural numbers a and b. If one defines natural numbers to be the cardinalities of finite sets, (the cardinality of a set is the number of elements in the set), then it is appropriate to define their sum as follows:
Here,  is the union of A and B. An alternate version of this definition allows A and B to possibly overlap and then takes their disjoint union, a mechanism that allows common elements to be separated out and therefore counted twice.

The other popular definition is recursive:
 Let n+ be the successor of n, that is the number following n in the natural numbers, so 0+=1, 1+=2. Define . Hence  .
Again, there are minor variations upon this definition in the literature. Taken literally, the above definition is an application of the recursion theorem on the partially ordered set N2. On the other hand, some sources prefer to use a restricted recursion theorem that applies only to the set of natural numbers. One then considers a to be temporarily "fixed", applies recursion on b to define a function "a +", and pastes these unary operations for all a together to form the full binary operation.

This recursive formulation of addition was developed by Dedekind as early as 1854, and he would expand upon it in the following decades. He proved the associative and commutative properties, among others, through mathematical induction.

Integers

The simplest conception of an integer is that it consists of an absolute value (which is a natural number) and a sign (generally either positive or negative). The integer zero is a special third case, being neither positive nor negative. The corresponding definition of addition must proceed by cases:
 For an integer n, let |n| be its absolute value. Let a and b be integers. If either a or b is zero, treat it as an identity. If a and b are both positive, define . If a and b are both negative, define . If a and b have different signs, define  to be the difference between |a| and |b|, with the sign of the term whose absolute value is larger. As an example, ; because −6 and 4 have different signs, their absolute values are subtracted, and since the absolute value of the negative term is larger, the answer is negative.

Although this definition can be useful for concrete problems, the number of cases to consider complicates proofs unnecessarily. So the following method is commonly used for defining integers.
So, one can define formally the integers as the equivalence classes of ordered pairs of natural numbers under the equivalence relation
 if and only if .
The equivalence class of  contains either  if , or  otherwise. This allows identifying the natural number  with the equivalence class .

Addition of ordered pairs is done component-wise:

A straightforward computation shows that the equivalence class of the result depends only on the equivalences classes of the summands, and thus that this defines an addition of equivalence classes, that is integers. Another straightforward computation shows that this addition is the same as the above case definition.

This way of defining integers as equivalence classes of pairs of natural numbers, can be used to embed into a group any commutative semigroup with cancellation property. Here, the semigroup is formed by the natural numbers and the group is the additive group of integers. The rational numbers are constructed similarly, by taking as semigroup the nonzero integers with multiplication.

This construction has been also generalized under the name of Grothendieck group to the case of any commutative semigroup. Without the cancellation property the semigroup homomorphism from the semigroup into the group may be non-injective. Originally, the Grothendieck group was, more specifically,  the result of this construction applied to the equivalences classes under isomorphisms of the objects of an abelian category, with the direct sum as semigroup operation.

Rational numbers (fractions)
Addition of rational numbers can be computed using the least common denominator, but a conceptually simpler definition involves only integer addition and multiplication:
 Define 

As an example, the sum .

Addition of fractions is much simpler when the denominators are the same; in this case, one can simply add the numerators while leaving the denominator the same: , so .

The commutativity and associativity of rational addition is an easy consequence of the laws of integer arithmetic. For a more rigorous and general discussion, see field of fractions.

Real numbers

A common construction of the set of real numbers is the Dedekind completion of the set of rational numbers. A real number is defined to be a Dedekind cut of rationals: a non-empty set of rationals that is closed downward and has no greatest element. The sum of real numbers a and b is defined element by element:
 Define 
This definition was first published, in a slightly modified form, by Richard Dedekind in 1872.
The commutativity and associativity of real addition are immediate; defining the real number 0 to be the set of negative rationals, it is easily seen to be the additive identity. Probably the trickiest part of this construction pertaining to addition is the definition of additive inverses.

Unfortunately, dealing with multiplication of Dedekind cuts is a time-consuming case-by-case process similar to the addition of signed integers. Another approach is the metric completion of the rational numbers. A real number is essentially defined to be the limit of a Cauchy sequence of rationals, lim an. Addition is defined term by term:
 Define 
This definition was first published by Georg Cantor, also in 1872, although his formalism was slightly different.
One must prove that this operation is well-defined, dealing with co-Cauchy sequences. Once that task is done, all the properties of real addition follow immediately from the properties of rational numbers. Furthermore, the other arithmetic operations, including multiplication, have straightforward, analogous definitions.

Complex numbers

Complex numbers are added by adding the real and imaginary parts of the summands. That is to say:

Using the visualization of complex numbers in the complex plane, the addition has the following geometric interpretation: the sum of two complex numbers A and B, interpreted as points of the complex plane, is the point X obtained by building a parallelogram three of whose vertices are O, A and B. Equivalently, X is the point such that the triangles with vertices O, A, B, and X, B, A, are congruent.

Generalizations
There are many binary operations that can be viewed as generalizations of the addition operation on the real numbers. The field of abstract algebra is centrally concerned with such generalized operations, and they also appear in set theory and category theory.

Abstract algebra

Vectors

In linear algebra, a vector space is an algebraic structure that allows for adding any two vectors and for scaling vectors. A familiar vector space is the set of all ordered pairs of real numbers; the ordered pair (a,b) is interpreted as a vector from the origin in the Euclidean plane to the point (a,b) in the plane. The sum of two vectors is obtained by adding their individual coordinates:

This addition operation is central to classical mechanics, in which velocities, accelerations and forces are all represented by vectors.

Matrices

Matrix addition is defined for two matrices of the same dimensions.

For example:

Modular arithmetic

In modular arithmetic, the set of available numbers is restricted to a finite subset of the integers, and addition "wraps around" when reaching a certain value, called the modulus. For example, the set of integers modulo 12 has twelve elements; it inherits an addition operation from the integers that is central to musical set theory. The set of integers modulo 2 has just two elements; the addition operation it inherits is known in Boolean logic as the "exclusive or" function. A similar "wrap around" operation arises in geometry, where the sum of two angle measures is often taken to be their sum as real numbers modulo 2π. This amounts to an addition operation on the circle, which in turn generalizes to addition operations on many-dimensional tori.

General theory
The general theory of abstract algebra allows an "addition" operation to be any associative and commutative operation on a set. Basic algebraic structures with such an addition operation include commutative monoids and abelian groups.

Set theory and category theory
A far-reaching generalization of addition of natural numbers is the addition of ordinal numbers and cardinal numbers in set theory. These give two different generalizations of addition of natural numbers to the transfinite. Unlike most addition operations, addition of ordinal numbers is not commutative. Addition of cardinal numbers, however, is a commutative operation closely related to the disjoint union operation.

In category theory, disjoint union is seen as a particular case of the coproduct operation, and general coproducts are perhaps the most abstract of all the generalizations of addition. Some coproducts, such as direct sum and wedge sum, are named to evoke their connection with addition.

Related operations
Addition, along with subtraction, multiplication and division, is considered one of the basic operations and is used in elementary arithmetic.

Arithmetic
Subtraction can be thought of as a kind of addition—that is, the addition of an additive inverse. Subtraction is itself a sort of inverse to addition, in that adding  and subtracting  are inverse functions.

Given a set with an addition operation, one cannot always define a corresponding subtraction operation on that set; the set of natural numbers is a simple example. On the other hand, a subtraction operation uniquely determines an addition operation, an additive inverse operation, and an additive identity; for this reason, an additive group can be described as a set that is closed under subtraction.

Multiplication can be thought of as repeated addition. If n is not a natural number, the product may still make sense; for example, multiplication by  yields the additive inverse of a number.

In the real and complex numbers, addition and multiplication can be interchanged by the exponential function:

This identity allows multiplication to be carried out by consulting a table of logarithms and computing addition by hand; it also enables multiplication on a slide rule. The formula is still a good first-order approximation in the broad context of Lie groups, where it relates multiplication of infinitesimal group elements with addition of vectors in the associated Lie algebra.

There are even more generalizations of multiplication than addition. In general, multiplication operations always distribute over addition; this requirement is formalized in the definition of a ring. In some contexts, such as the integers, distributivity over addition and the existence of a multiplicative identity is enough to uniquely determine the multiplication operation. The distributive property also provides information about addition; by expanding the product  in both ways, one concludes that addition is forced to be commutative. For this reason, ring addition is commutative in general.

Division is an arithmetic operation remotely related to addition. Since , division is right distributive over addition: .

Ordering

The maximum operation "max (a, b)" is a binary operation similar to addition. In fact, if two nonnegative numbers a and b are of different orders of magnitude, then their sum is approximately equal to their maximum. This approximation is extremely useful in the applications of mathematics, for example in truncating Taylor series. However, it presents a perpetual difficulty in numerical analysis, essentially since "max" is not invertible. If b is much greater than a, then a straightforward calculation of  can accumulate an unacceptable round-off error, perhaps even returning zero. See also Loss of significance.

The approximation becomes exact in a kind of infinite limit; if either a or b is an infinite cardinal number, their cardinal sum is exactly equal to the greater of the two. Accordingly, there is no subtraction operation for infinite cardinals.

Maximization is commutative and associative, like addition. Furthermore, since addition preserves the ordering of real numbers, addition distributes over "max" in the same way that multiplication distributes over addition:

For these reasons, in tropical geometry one replaces multiplication with addition and addition with maximization. In this context, addition is called "tropical multiplication", maximization is called "tropical addition", and the tropical "additive identity" is negative infinity. Some authors prefer to replace addition with minimization; then the additive identity is positive infinity.

Tying these observations together, tropical addition is approximately related to regular addition through the logarithm:

which becomes more accurate as the base of the logarithm increases. The approximation can be made exact by extracting a constant h, named by analogy with Planck's constant from quantum mechanics, and taking the "classical limit" as h tends to zero:

In this sense, the maximum operation is a dequantized version of addition.

Other ways to add

Summation describes the addition of arbitrarily many numbers, usually more than just two. It includes the idea of the sum of a single number, which is itself, and the empty sum, which is zero. An infinite summation is a delicate procedure known as a series.

Counting a finite set is equivalent to summing 1 over the set.

Integration is a kind of "summation" over a continuum, or more precisely and generally, over a differentiable manifold. Integration over a zero-dimensional manifold reduces to summation.

Linear combinations combine multiplication and summation; they are sums in which each term has a multiplier, usually a real or complex number. Linear combinations are especially useful in contexts where straightforward addition would violate some normalization rule, such as mixing of strategies in game theory or superposition of states in quantum mechanics.

Convolution is used to add two independent random variables defined by distribution functions. Its usual definition combines integration, subtraction, and multiplication. In general, convolution is useful as a kind of domain-side addition; by contrast, vector addition is a kind of range-side addition.

In music 
 
Addition is also used in the musical set theory. George Perle gives the following example: “do-mi, re-fa♯, mi♭-sol are different requirements of one interval... or other type of equality... and are connected with the axis of symmetry. Do-mi belongs to the family of symmetrically connected dyads as it is shown further:”

re   re♯   mi    fa     fa♯   sol   sol♯

re   do♯  do    si     la♯    la    sol♯

Axis of the pitches are italicized, the axis is defined with the pitch category.

Thus, do-mi is a part of an interval family-4 and a part of sum family -2 (at G♯ = 0).

A tonal range of Alban Berg’s Lyric Suite {0,11,7,4,2,9,3,8,10,1,5,6} is a series of six dyads with their total number being 11.  If the line is turned and inverted, then it is {0,6,5,1,...} with all dyads in total being 6.

The total number of successive dyads of a tonal range in Lyric Suite is 11

do   sol    re   re♯    la♯   mi♯

si    mi     la    sol♯  do♯  fa♯

Axis of the pitches are italicized, the axis is defined by the dyads (interval 1).

See also
 Lunar arithmetic
 Mental arithmetic
 Parallel addition (mathematics)
 Verbal arithmetic (also known as cryptarithms), puzzles involving addition

Notes

Footnotes

References

History
 
 
 
 

Elementary mathematics
 

Education
 
 California State Board of Education mathematics content standards Adopted December 1997, accessed December 2005.
 
 
 

Cognitive science
 
 

Mathematical exposition
 
 
 
 
 
 
 

Advanced mathematics
 
 
 
 
 
 
 
 
 
 

Mathematical research
 
 
 Litvinov, Grigory; Maslov, Victor; Sobolevskii, Andreii (1999). Idempotent mathematics and interval analysis. Reliable Computing, Kluwer.
 
 
 

Computing

Further reading
 
 
 
 
 

 
Elementary arithmetic
Mathematical notation
Articles with example C code